Geng Biao (26 August 1909 – 23 June 2000) was a senior official in the Chinese Communist Party (CCP) and a leader in Chinese politics, foreign relations and military.

Early life
Geng was born in Liling, Hunan Province of China.

In 1922, Geng was a child worker in a lead-zinc mine in Shuikoushan, south of Hengyang City in China. 

Geng joined the Communist Youth League of China in Shuikoushan in 1925. In 1926, he led a miners' military campaign and failed. He then organized and led a militia in Liuyang in 1928. In August of the same year, he joined CCP.

Military career

Red Army
In September 1930, his forces merged into the Third Corps of the Red Army's First Army Group and he became the staff of 9th division of Third Corps. In 1933, he became the head of the 4th regiment, 2nd division of the Red First Front Army. On 10 October 1934, he embarked on the Long March as the pioneer of 2nd division and, in the beginning of 1935, seized a critical military fortress at Loushanguan in Guizhou Province. As a result, he was promoted to the chief of staff of the 1st division of Red 1st Front Army after Zunyi Conference. After arrival in northern Shaanxi, he was severely wounded in combat. In 1936, he graduated from the Counter-Japanese Military and Political University and was appointed the chief of staff of the Fourth Corps of the Red Fourth Front Army.  The Fourth Corps had just arrived in northern Shaanxi having been commanded by Zhang Guotao, and Geng took control of the unit.

Sino-Japanese War

After outbreak of Second Sino-Japanese War, he became the chief of staff, deputy head and deputy political commissar in 385 brigade, 129 division of Eighth Route Army. His army occupied East Gansu Province, responsible for the safety of west border of Shaan-Gan-Ning Region. He entered the school of the CCP's central committee. After graduation, he went to Jin-Cha-Ji Region and became a military leader there. He led his army to seize Zhangjiakou in 1945.

Chinese Civil War
In 1946, Geng accompanied Ye Jianying to participate in the Beiping Military Conciliatory Commission, initiated by General George C. Marshall to promote and prevent the outbreak of civil war between the Chinese Communists and Nationalists.  Geng was the vice chief of staff of CCP's delegates. After the conciliation failed, he went back to Jin-Cha-Ji Region and became the chief of staff of the Field Army in the military region. In 1948, he was appointed as the vice commander of the second army group in North China Military Region. He fought in Pingjin Campaign and the capture of Taiyuan.

Political career

After the formation of People's Republic of China, Geng was appointed as the ambassador to Sweden, and minister to Denmark and Finland on 9 May 1950. He was also the ambassador to Pakistan, Myanmar and Albania. He returned to China in 1971, and became the head of CCP's central foreign communication department, in charge of CCP's relations with foreign parties.

On 6 October 1976, he was ordered to take control of the broadcast and TV stations in Beijing, during the putsch against Gang of Four.  Subsequently, he supervised the propaganda efforts of the CCP. In 1978, he was appointed as vice-premier of the State Council, in charge of foreign relations, military industry, civil airlines and tourism. In January 1979, he became the secretary-general and member of Standing Committee of CCP's Central Military Commission. 

In 1981, he became the first Minister of National Defense of the People's Republic of China not to have held the rank of Marshal, and the only one never to have received a military rank despite his previous combat experience. He was replaced as Minister of Defence and became state councilor the following year. In 1983, he became vice chairman of the Standing Committee of the National People's Congress, and chairmen of foreign relation committee in PNC. He was also a member of Standing Committee of CCP's senior consultative committee. He was awarded First-Class Red Star Medal. 

He died on 23 June 2000 in Beijing.

References

External links 
 http://www.fmprc.gov.cn/chn/ziliao/wjrw/lrfbzjbzzl/t9064.htm

1909 births
2000 deaths
Ministers of National Defense of the People's Republic of China
People from Zhuzhou
People's Liberation Army generals from Hunan
Eighth Route Army personnel
Ambassadors of China to Pakistan
Ambassadors of China to Sweden
Ambassadors of China to Denmark
Ambassadors of China to Finland
Ambassadors of China to Myanmar
Ambassadors of China to Albania
Chinese Communist Party politicians from Hunan
People's Republic of China politicians from Hunan
Heads of the Publicity Department of the Chinese Communist Party
State councillors of China
Members of the 11th Politburo of the Chinese Communist Party
Vice Chairpersons of the National People's Congress
Burials at Babaoshan Revolutionary Cemetery